Sun Weizhe (born 1 January 1997) is a Chinese footballer who currently plays for China League One side Zibo Cuju.

Club career
Sun Weizhe started his professional football career in 2015 when he was promoted to Chinese Super League club Guizhou Renhe's first team squad. He made his senior debut on 7 July 2015 in a 3–2 away win over second-tier club Jiangxi Liansheng in the 2015 Chinese FA Cup. Sun was loaned to Belgian club Roeselare in September 2016. On 26 February 2017, he made his debut for the club in a 1–1 away draw against Lierse, coming on as a substitute for Saviour Godwin in the 89th minute. He continued to play five matches in the 2016–17 Europa League play-offs.

Sun returned to Beijing Renhe in the summer of 2017. He made his league debut for Renhe on 28 October 2017, playing the whole match in a 2–1 home win against Hangzhou Greentown. Sun made his Super League debut on 3 March 2018 in a 1–0 away loss against Chongqing Dangdai Lifan, coming on for Luo Xin in the 73rd minute.

Career statistics
.

References

External links
 

1997 births
Living people
Chinese footballers
Footballers from Hebei
Sportspeople from Handan
Association football midfielders
Beijing Renhe F.C. players
K.S.V. Roeselare players
Challenger Pro League players
Chinese Super League players
China League One players
Chinese expatriate footballers
Expatriate footballers in Belgium